The Trophée Ville de Monaco or the City of Monaco Trophy in English, is an association football cup competition held for football clubs in the country of Monaco. It is the second-highest football competition in Monaco, behind the Challenge Prince Rainier III.

Champions

 1995 – Anciens O.S. Monaco
 1996 – SBM Administration
 1997 – Sûreté Publique
 1998 – Mairie de Monaco
 1999 – HBS
 2000 – Crédit Foncier
 2001 – OSM Monacolor
 2002 – Ribeiro Frères
 2003 – Anciens Hôpital
 2004 – Sofamo Biotherm
 2005 – Single Buoy Moorins
 2006 – Mecaplast Group
 2007 – SMA
 2008 – Lancaster Group

 2009 – Sofamo Biotherm
 2010 – Sûreté Publique
 2011 – CCF Wolzok
 2012 – Mairie de Monaco
 2013 – SMB Slot Machines
 2014 – Sûreté Publique
 2015 – Carabiniers du Prince FC
 2016 – CCF Wolzok
 2017 – Pompiers Monaco
 2018 – Centre Rainier III
 2019 – Sûreté Publique
 2020 – A.P. Poste M.C.
 2021 – cancelled due to the COVID-19 pandemic
 2022 – Sûreté Publique

See also
Challenge Monégasque

References 

Football competitions in Monaco